Sourou Sport is a Burkinabé football club based in Tougan, Burkina Faso. The team was founded in 1954 and play in the Burkinabé Second Division.

Stadium
Currently the team plays at the 2000 capacity Stade Sangoulé-Lamizana.

League participations
Burkinabé Premier League: 2009–2013
Burkinabé Second Division: 2013–

References

External links
 Soccerway
 LeFaso

Football clubs in Burkina Faso
Association football clubs established in 1954